Hockey Club Almaty is a professional ice hockey team based in Almaty, Kazakhstan. They were founded in 2010, and play in the Kazakhstan Hockey Championship, the top level of ice hockey in Kazakhstan. They play at the Baluan Sholak Palace of Culture and Sports named after Baluan Sholak.

Season-by-season record
Note: GP = Games played, W = Wins, L = Losses, T = Ties, OTW = Overtime/shootout wins, OTL = Overtime/shootout losses, Pts = Points, GF = Goals for, GA = Goals against

Head coaches
 Alexander Vysotsky 2010-12
 Oleg Bolyakin 2012
 Alexander Vysotsky 2012-13

See also
Yenbek Almaty

External links
Official website

Ice hockey teams in Kazakhstan
Sport in Almaty